Petaling Jaya may refer to:
Petaling Jaya
Petaling Jaya (federal constituency), formerly represented in the Dewan Rakyat (1986–95)
Petaling Jaya Selatan (federal constituency), represented in the Dewan Rakyat
Petaling Jaya Utara (federal constituency), represented in the Dewan Rakyat
Petaling Jaya (state constituency), formerly represented in the Selangor State Legislative Assembly (1974–86)

See also
Petaling (disambiguation)